The Oskar Pfister Award was established by the American Psychiatric Association (APA), with the Association of Mental Health Clergy (now the Association of Professional Chaplains), in 1983 to honor those who have made significant contributions to the field of religion and psychiatry.  The recipient delivers a lecture at an APA conference during the year of award, although the 2002 lecture was delivered by Susan Larson on behalf of her late husband.  The award is named in honor of Oskar Pfister, a chaplain who discussed the religious aspects of psychology with Sigmund Freud.

Award winners
Source: Association of Professional Chaplains
1983 - Jerome D. Frank
1984 - Wayne Oates
1985 - Viktor Frankl
1986 - Hans Küng
1987 - Robert Jay Lifton
1988 - Oliver Sacks
1989 - William W. Meissner
1990 - Peter Gay
1991 - Robert Coles
1992 - Paulos Mar Gregorios
1993 - Paul R. Fleischman
1994 - James W. Fowler III
1995 - Prakash Desai
1996 - Ann Belford Ulanov
1997 - Ana-Maria Rizzuto
1998 - Allen Bergin
1999 - Don S. Browning
2000 - Paul Ricoeur
2001 - Irvin D. Yalom
2002 - David Larson
2003 - Abraham Twerski
2004 - Elizabeth Bowman
2005 - Armand Nicholi
2006 - Ned H. Cassem
2007 - William R. Miller
2008 - Dan G. Blazer
2009 - Kenneth I. Pargament
2010 - George E. Vaillant
2011 - Clark S. Aist
2012 - Harold G. Koenig
2013 - Marc Galanter
2014 -	C. Robert Cloninger
2015 - Allan Josephson
2016 -	James W. Lomax 
2017 -	James Griffith
2018 -	John Swinton

See also

 List of psychology awards
 List of awards named after people

References

Medicine awards 
American psychology awards
Awards established in 1983